Robert Fay Rockwell (February 11, 1886 – September 29, 1950) was a U.S. Representative from Colorado. He served in the Colorado Senate and House of Representatives. He was also Lieutenant Governor of Colorado. He was a cattle rancher in western Colorado.

Early life and education
Born in Cortland, New York, he was the son of Lemuel Wilson and Elizabeth (Smith) Rockwell. Rockwell attended the public schools of Hornell, New York and was a 1905 graduate of The Hill School in Pottstown, Pennsylvania.  He attended Princeton University from 1905 to 1906.

Career
He moved to Paonia, Colorado, in 1907 and engaged in cattle raising and fruit growing.

He served as member of the Colorado House of Representatives from 1917 to 1921. He served in the state senate from 1921 to 1923. He served as lieutenant governor from 1923 to 1925. In 1924, he was an unsuccessful candidate for the Republican nomination for governor, losing to Clarence Morley, who went on to win the general election.  Rockwell was the Republican nominee for governor in 1930, and lost to incumbent Billy Adams. He served as member of the State board of agriculture from 1932 to 1946.  Rockwell was again a member of the state senate from 1938 to 1941.

Rockwell was elected as a Republican to the Seventy-seventh Congress to fill the vacancy caused by the death of Edward T. Taylor. He was reelected to the Seventy-eighth, Seventy-ninth, and Eightieth Congresses and served from December 9, 1941, to January 3, 1949. He was an unsuccessful candidate for reelection in 1948 to the Eighty-first Congress.  After leaving Congress, Rockwell resumed cattle ranching in Colorado. He served as chairman of the board of directors of Tuttle & Rockwell Co., Hornell, New York, and Rockwell Co., Corning, New York.

He was a member of the Sons of the American Revolution. He was also a Mason and a member of the Paonia Rotary Club.

Personal life
He married Aileen Miller on June 24, 1908 and had two sons, Robert F. Rockwell, Jr. and Wilson M. Rockwell. He had a home in Miami, Florida and a ranch in Colorado. Aileen died at their home in Miami on March 5, 1938. He married Elizabeth Armstrong on November 23, 1948.

He died unexpectedly of a cerebral hemorrhage at his home in Maher, Colorado on September 29, 1950. He was interred in Hornell Cemetery, Hornell, New York.

References

External links
 

1886 births
1950 deaths
Republican Party members of the Colorado House of Representatives
Republican Party Colorado state senators
Lieutenant Governors of Colorado
The Hill School alumni
People from Cortland, New York
Republican Party members of the United States House of Representatives from Colorado
20th-century American politicians
People from Paonia, Colorado
People from Adams Morgan